Như Quỳnh (born 1970) is an American-Vietnamese singer.

Như Quỳnh may also refer to:

 Như Quỳnh, a town in Văn Lâm District, Vietnam
 Như Quỳnh (actress) (born 1954)